Hadi Tavoosi (هادی طاووسی in Persian, born 7 October 1938 in Tehran, Iran) is a retired Iranian footballer and administrator. He was a goalkeeper and has played most of his playing careers in Shahin and Persepolis. He was also played one season at Paykan on loan. He was retired in 1974 and became a vice president at Iranian Football Federation. After resignation of Naser Noamooz in 1980, Tavoosi was appointed as president of the football federation. He was president of Iranian FA from 6 October 1980 until 8 August 1981.

Honours
Shahin
Tehran Football League
Winner (2): 1958–59, 1965–66
Runner-Up (4): 1957–58, 1959–60, 1961–62, 1962–63
Tehran Hazfi Cup
Winner (1): 1962–63
Runners-Up (2): 1956–57, 1957–58

Persepolis
Iranian Football League
Winners (2): 1971–72, 1973–74

Paykan
Tehran Football League
Winner (1): 1969–70

References

1938 births
Living people
Presidents of Iranian Football Federation
People from Tehran
Iranian footballers
Shahin FC players
Persepolis F.C. players
Association football goalkeepers